Floronia bucculenta is a species of spiders in the family Linyphiidae. It is found in Europe and Russia.

References 

 Floronia bucculenta at the World Spider Catalog

Linyphiidae
Spiders described in 1757
Taxa named by Carl Alexander Clerck
Spiders of Europe
Spiders of Russia